James Jack Seminoff (September 1, 1922 – June 12, 2001) was an American professional basketball player.

A 6'2" guard / forward from the University of Southern California, Seminoff earned first-team All-PCC in 1943. He played four seasons (1946–1950) in the Basketball Association of America as a member of the Chicago Stags and Boston Celtics.  He averaged 6.5 points per game in his career.

BAA/NBA career statistics

Regular season

Playoffs

References

External links

1922 births
2001 deaths
American men's basketball players
Basketball players from Los Angeles
Boston Celtics players
Chicago Stags players
College men's basketball referees in the United States
USC Trojans men's basketball players
Forwards (basketball)
Guards (basketball)